Ignacio Carou (born 12 July 1999) is an Argentine-born Uruguayan tennis player.

Carou has a career high ATP singles ranking of 697 achieved on 28 February 2022. He also has a career high ATP doubles ranking of 397 achieved on 21 February 2022.

Carou represents Uruguay at the Davis Cup.

References

External links

1999 births
Living people
Argentine male tennis players
Uruguayan male tennis players
Tennis players from Buenos Aires